is a Japanese former singer, actress and Japanese idol active in the 1980s. As an actress, she is known for starring in the Otoko wa Tsurai yo films and the Jackie Chan film City Hunter. In 1995, she quit her artistic career and married the French racing driver, Jean Alesi, with whom she has three children, Helena, Giuliano, and John.

Filmography

TV shows 

 Dokuganryū Masamune (NHK, 1987), young Megohime
 Mama wa Idol (TBS, 1987)
 Kaze Shojo (NTV, 1988)
 Tsukai! Rock-n-Roll Toori (TBS, 1988)
 Taiheiki (NHK, 1991), Kitabatake Akiie
 Mo Namida wa Misenai (Fuji TV, 1993)
 DCU (TBS, 2022), Maria Silva

Films 

 Memories of You (1988)
 Otoko wa Tsurai yo series:
Tora-san, My Uncle (1989)
Tora-san Takes a Vacation (1990)
Tora-san Confesses (1991)
Tora-San Makes Excuses (1992)
Tora-san to the Rescue (1995)
Tora-san, Wish You Were Here (2019)
 City Hunter (1993)
 Camp de Aimasho (1995)

Commercial 

Mazda Carol (1995-1996)
JR East (1987–)
Kirin "Kirin 1000 (Southern)" (2010–)

Discography

Single 
 Teardrop (released March 18, 1987)

Awards

References

External links 
  
 

1974 births
Living people
Actresses from Tokyo
Japanese female idols
Japanese film actresses
Japanese television actresses
Japanese women pop singers
Japanese expatriates in Switzerland
Singers from Tokyo
20th-century Japanese actresses
20th-century Japanese women singers
20th-century Japanese singers
21st-century Japanese actresses
21st-century Japanese women singers
21st-century Japanese singers